"Validée" is a song by Booba and Benash released in 2015 from the album Nero Nemesis.

Charts

References 

2015 songs
2015 singles
French-language songs